Alessandro Aretusi was an Italian portrait painter of the 17th century from Modena, active in Florence painting for the court of the Grand Dukes.

References

17th-century Italian painters
Italian male painters
Painters from Modena
Year of death unknown
Year of birth unknown